Vista Hermosa is a town and municipality in the Meta Department, Colombia. That is located approximately 6 hours from Bogotá D.C. It has fully paved access roads that allow a quick movement to the urban area and the visualization of its beautiful landscapes that live up to its name.

This municipality is made up of 84 villages and its population is approximately 25,000 inhabitants. It has limits with the municipalities of San Juan de Arama, La Macarena, Puerto Lleras, Mesetas, Uribe Meta

Sightseeing 
Vista Hermosa is one of the municipalities that develop ecotourism since it has a great wealth of natural resources, with a variety of landscapes, including hot springs, beaches, jets, pipes among others. Among them, the best known are the beaches of the Guejar river, the asphalt mine in Maracaibo, the Sardinata jets in the Maracaibo village, the Unión jets in the Caño Unión village, the archaeological park in the Cunimia village, and the attractions of the Park National Natural Serranía de La Macarena.

Caño Unión 
Thanks to its water wealth, Vistahermosa attracts many tourists each year to enjoy its beautiful landscapes, proof of this is CAÑO UNION. This is one of the largest waterfalls in the department of Meta, the imposing size and rock formation; as well as its crystal clear water jets makes it one of the most visited places. Given the conditions of its geographical location, it has a large vegetation that favors the realization of family activities such as walks, hiking and camping.

Waterfall Sardinata 
In Vista Hermosa Meta, its  found The Sardinata jets are located in the Maracaibo path, it has a fall from natural water, is one of the highest waterfalls in Meta, approximately 150 meters high.

River Güejar 
This is one of the main tributaries of the region providing multiple benefits to the entire community that surrounds it, such as fishing, transportation to areas of difficult access and thanks to its striking crystalline waters it stands out for being one of the largest sources of tourism. It is surprising for its multiple natural pools, waterfalls and rock formations that are part of the Guyanese Shield.

One of the main tourist activities is rafting and canoeing through the Güejar canyon. This place had been hidden because of the armed conflict that took place in previous years and that today can be visited without any restrictions.

References 

 "Caño Unión: asómbrate con este laberinto natural en el Meta" .(in Spanish).Retrieved 21 November 2021.
 "Vista Hermosa" .Colombia Turismo web.(in Spanish).Retrieved 21 November 2021.
 "Turismo vista Hermosa".2011.(inspanish)..Retrieved 21 November 2021

Municipalities of Meta Department